Raimundo Rubí, O. Cart. (18 October 1665 – 20 January 1729) was a Roman Catholic prelate who served as Bishop of Catania (1727–1729).

Biography
Raimundo Rubí was born in Barcelona, Spain on 18 October 1665 and ordained a priest in Carthusian Order on 17 December 1689.
On Bishop of Catania, he was selected as Bishop of Catania and confirmed by Pope Benedict XIII on 26 November 1727.
On 8 December 1727, he was consecrated bishop by Pope Benedict XIII, with Francesco Antonio Finy, Titular Archbishop of Damascus, and VIncenzo Maria Mazzoleni, Archbishop of Corfu, serving as co-consecrators. 
He served as Bishop of Catania until his death on 20 January 1729.

References 

18th-century Roman Catholic bishops in Sicily
Bishops appointed by Pope Benedict XIII
1665 births
1729 deaths
Clergy from Barcelona
Carthusian bishops